Rynarcice may refer to the following places in Poland:
Rynarcice, Lower Silesian Voivodeship (south-west Poland)
Rynarcice, Opole Voivodeship (south-west Poland)